This is a list of Portuguese television related events from 2014.

Events
1 January - Luís Nascimento wins the fourth series of Secret Story.
2 February - Érica Silva, who finished in 4th place in the fourth series of Secret Story wins the second series of Secret Story: Desafio Final.
9 February - Berg wins the first series of Factor X.
27 July - Rui Drumond wins the second series of The Voice Portugal.
14 September - Remédio Santo actor Lourenço Ortigão and his partner Mónica Rosa win the second series of Dança com as Estrelas.
14 December - 14-year-old Diogo Garcia wins the first series of The Voice Kids.
31 December - Kika Kardoso wins the second series of Factor X.

Television shows

Programs debuting in 2014

Programs ending in 2014

Television films and specials

Programs returning in 2014

Programs changing networks

Deaths